The Abbaye de la Fille-Dieu is a Cistercian monastery located near the town of Romont in the Swiss Canton of Fribourg. Founded as a Benedictine priory in 1268, and continuously occupied by a community of nuns since its establishment, the alpine abbey is a Swiss heritage site of national significance. Heavily altered through its history, Fille-Dieu was restructured by economic turmoil, fire, additions and unsympathetic alterations. In 1906 the abbey became affiliated with the Trappists, and between 1990 and 1996 an internationally notable restoration was undertaken, modernising the monastic buildings, restoring the abbey church to its original volume, and preserving its rediscovered medieval murals, with the only contemporary element a suite of stained glass windows commissioned from the British artist Brian Clarke. Further restoration of the abbey continues today.

Early history
In 1268, the Bishop of Lausanne, Jean de Cossonay, visited a small community of women who, in 1265, had founded a house of prayer near Romont. He authorised Juliette, Pernette and Cécile de Villa to erect a monastery on the site and gave it the name 'Fille-Dieu'.

Modern history
In 1906, the abbey joined the Cistercian Order of Strict Observance, colloquially known as Trappists.

Restoration

Stained glass
In 2009, the stained glass of the oculus window of the abbey was destroyed in a hailstorm. The artist, Brian Clarke, had been dissatisfied with the 1996 resolution of the window in his original programme of works, and this "sign of God" presented an opportunity to design and fabricate a replacement, for which he was commissioned. The new window was inaugurated and blessed in 2010, and the design for the window was presented to the Swiss National Museum of Stained Glass in Romont.

Further reading
La Fille-Dieu, Un Monastère Cistercien En Pays Romand Benedikt Rast. 1978. Fribourg: St-Paul. .
Les Vitraux de la Fille-Dieu de Brian Clarke/Die Glasgemälde der Fille-Dieu von Brian Clarke (1997). Stefan Trümpler. Wabern-Berne: Benteli Editions. L'abbaye cistercienne de la Fille-Dieu a Romont/Musée suisse du vitrail a Romont. .
Liturgie Et Musique a l'Abbaye Cistercienne Notre-Dame de la Fille-Dieu: Histoire Et Catalogue Des Sources de Sept Siecles de Vie Chorale (2015). Aschendorff Verlag. .
 Wilde, D. "Brian Clarke's Windows at Abbaye De La Fille-Dieu." Stained Glass: Quarterly of the Stained Glass Association of America. 94.1 (1999): 47-51. Print.

References

External links 
 Official website
 Association des Amis de la Fille-Dieu/Verein Freunde des Klosters Fille-Dieu

Cistercian monasteries in Switzerland
Trappist monasteries
Swiss culture
Fribourg
Monasteries
Churches in Switzerland
Christian monasteries established in the 13th century
1268 establishments
13th-century establishments in Switzerland
Buildings and structures in the canton of Fribourg
Cultural property of national significance in the canton of Fribourg